Broadcast.com was an Internet radio company founded as AudioNet in September 1995 by Cameron Christopher Jaeb. Todd Wagner and Mark Cuban later led the organization and eventually sold to Yahoo! on April 1, 1999, for $5.7 billion, making it the most expensive acquisition Yahoo! has made. The service has since been discontinued.

History 
The company was founded in 1989 as Cameron Audio Networks, named after its founder Cameron Christopher Jaeb, who received an initial investment from his father. Jaeb wanted a method for people to be able to listen to out-of-town sports games. The original idea, a shortwave radio that would receive broadcasts inside a sports venue, morphed into a handheld device that would receive customized satellite broadcasts. With the support of his father Tom, Jaeb incorporated.

Jaeb then began soliciting the rights to broadcast radio and professional sports games live on the Internet, making 80–100 calls per day.

In 1994, through a class that his girlfriend was taking, Jaeb was introduced to Todd Wagner, an attorney at Akin Gump Strauss Hauer & Feld. Wagner introduced Jaeb to Mark Cuban, who invested $10,000 in exchange for 2% of the company. Cuban wanted to listen to the basketball games of his alma mater, Indiana University. Cuban and Wagner worked out a deal whereby Jaeb would keep 10% of the company and would get a monthly salary of $2,500 but Cuban would take control of the company. The company was renamed AudioNet.com in September 1995 in conjunction with the reorganization. At first, Cuban picked up signals from KLIF (AM) in his bedroom and then streamed them on the Internet. The company grew from mainly broadcasting sporting events to broadcasting U.S. presidential nominating conventions and many other events.

In 1998, AudioNet was renamed to Broadcast.com and in July 1998, the company became a public company via an initial public offering. The stock price soared 250% on its first day of trading, a record for a newly-issued public stock. After the IPO, the company was worth $1 billion, Mark Cuban was worth $300 million, and Todd Wagner was worth $170 million.

On April 1, 1999, less than nine months after the IPO, Yahoo! announced the acquisition of Broadcast.com for $5.7 billion in stock. At the time, Broadcast.com had 570,000 users and the purchase price was $10,000 per user. Cuban sold most of his Yahoo! stock that same year, netting over $1 billion. Founder Chris Jaeb, whose stake was diluted to less than 1% of the company, received approximately $50 million from the sale.

The service became a part of Yahoo! Broadcast Services.

Yahoo! shut down much of its broadcast services in 2002, and Broadcast.com has since been discontinued. Yahoo!'s high-profile purchase of Broadcast.com has since been called one of the worst Internet acquisitions.

See also 
 List of Internet radio stations
 List of online music databases
 The Dan & Scott Show

References

External links 
 

Internet properties established in 1995
Internet properties disestablished in 1999
American music websites
Defunct websites
Discontinued Yahoo! services
Internet radio in the United States
Defunct digital music services or companies
Yahoo! acquisitions
Dot-com bubble
Webby Award winners
Defunct online companies of the United States
1998 initial public offerings
1999 mergers and acquisitions